Cosmo Manuche (bap. 1613, d. 1673?), English playwright of an Italian heritage, baptized on 24 October 1613 at The Church of St Andrew, Holborn, in the City of London. He is best-known for two plays written in 1652: The Just General: a Tragi:Comedy  and The Loyal Lovers: a Tragi Comedy, as well as his connection to his patron James Compton, 3rd Earl of Northampton.

 Early life 
Manuche was christened on October 24, 1613, at St Andrew's, Holborn, in the liberties of the City of London, as the oldest surviving son of the painter James Manuche (c.1590–1633) and Katherine, who resided near the Windmill in Shoe Lane, Holborn. His grandfather, Jacomo Manuche (d. 1593), originally came to England about 1573 and spent many years in Sir Francis Walsingham's intelligence-gathering network in England and overseas. Queen Elizabeth I awarded his grandfather a £40 pension for life in 1577.

Cosmo Manuche enrolled at Merchant Taylors' School in London in 1626, a few years after John Webster, the future dramatist, whose family lived near the Manuches in Shoe Lane. He would have presumably dropped out of school around 1631 or 1632. There is no evidence that Cosmo Manuche enrolled at a university. It is possible that he could not attend due to family obligations. His father, James Manuche, died on March 7, 1633, and was buried at St Andrew's, Holborn. Cosmo Manuche was still living in the family house in the early 1630s.

 Marriage and children 
He married Anne Cooley (d. 1641) on January 19, 1636, at St Dunstan and All Saints, Stepney. There is no record of any of the couple's children being christened at St Andrew's, Holborn. They continued to reside there, because Anne was buried in this same parish on April 11, 1641. Manuche married his second wife, Frances Brewster, on October 27, 1648, in the church of St Bartholomew-the-Less, London. Manuche mentions daughters in the dedication (to James Compton, 3rd Earl of Northampton) of his play The Feast (c.1664).

 Death and afterwards 
On 7 November 1673, a Major Mullinax was buried in Westminster Abbey's Dark Cloister, and it seems probable that he was Cosmo Manuche, as Manuche's wife Frances Manuche was also buried in the cloisters on 11 January 1676.

Even though his plays were never acted, according to Nicholas Watson they “contain a significance beyond their literary or dramatic worth. For Manuche belongs with some scores of other minor dramatists who were the real harbingers of the Restoration Drama, continuing as they did with the decadent elements in Ben Jonson, John Fletcher, Thomas Middleton, Philip Massinger, John Webster and thus forming a rather closely connected bridge between the later Jacobean dramatists and William Wycherley, John Vanbrugh, William Congreve”.

 Recognition 
Manuche used the designation ‘Major,’ signalling armed involvement in the royalist cause, along with his patron, James Compton, the third Earl of Northampton, who also composed some dramatic works.

 Published works 
 The Just General: a Tragi:Comedy The Loyal Lovers: a Tragi Comedy (1652)
 The Bastard, published anonymously (1652)  Bishop Percy found, around 1770, nine manuscript plays other than those already named in the Marquis of Northampton's library at Castle Ashby: 
 The Banished Shepherdess The Feast: a comedy The Mandrake (a comedy in prose), is unfinished
 Agamemnon: a tragedy, is unfinished
 Leontius, King of Ciprus The Captives Mariamne''
 Two untitled works

References 

Year of birth unknown
Year of death uncertain
English people of Italian descent
17th-century English dramatists and playwrights
English male dramatists and playwrights
People from the City of London